Huar Island or Guar Island is an island of Calbuco Archipelago located in the Reloncaví Sound. There are 5 settlements in the island and 5 schools: Quetrolauquén, Alfaro, Nalcahue, Chucagua y Colhue. The island was one of the last places of the Chono people.

There is no electricity network on the island, but the 5 schools are connected with Internet.

References

Calbuco Archipelago
Islands of Los Lagos Region